The 1997 Winter European Youth Olympic Winter Days was an international multi-sport event held between 7 and 13 February 1997, in Sundsvall, Sweden.

Sports

Alpine skiing

Biathlon

Cross-country skiing

Figure skating

Ice hockey

Short track speed skating

Speed skating

Medal table

External links
 Results

European Youth Olympic Winter Festival
European Youth Olympic Winter Festival
European Youth Olympic Winter Festival
European Youth Olympic Winter Festival
International sports competitions hosted by Sweden
Youth sport in Sweden
Sports festivals in Sweden
1997 in youth sport
February 1997 sports events in Europe
Sports competitions in Sundsvall